Kung Fu League is a 2018 Chinese martial arts fantasy comedy film directed by Jeffrey Lau and written by Huang Jianhong, which featured an ensemble cast include Vincent Zhao, Andy On, Danny Chan and Dennis To. Ashin Shu played the lead role and also narrated the film. The film was released in China on 26 October 2018 and in Hong Kong on 13 October 2018. It received largely mixed to negative reviews from audience and critics.

Plot 
Fei Yingxiong, an indigent comic book artist, is romantically interested in Bao'er, but the head manager of their company, who also has a interest in Bao'er, prevents that from happening. So, he summons four legendary Kung Fu masters to learn the highest level of martial arts and help him get his girl.

Cast

Main cast
 Vincent Zhao as Wong Fei-hung
 Andy On as Huo Yuanjia
 Danny Chan as Chen Zhen
 Dennis To as Ip Man
 Ashin Shu as Fei Yingxiong/Narrator
 Madina Memet as Bao'er

Supporting cast
 He Yunwei	as Shi Gandang
 Steven Zhang as Manager Zhang Peng
 Zhang Yao as 13th aunt
 Zhou Zhinuo as Maid Chun Hua
 Zhang Mingming as Brother Tao
 Wu Chenchen as cashier

Special and cameo appearance
 Bruce Leung as Qiao Shanhu
 Leung Kar-yan as Director Zhang
 Kingdom Yuen as Aunt Ying
 Hung Yan-yan as Clubfoot Kai
 Lam Tze-chung as Butcher Wing
 Timmy Hung as Bucktooth Su
 Ken Lo as Villain Kin
 Cheung Wing-fat as A Niu

References

External links 
 
 
 

2018 films
Films directed by Jeffrey Lau
Chinese action comedy films
Chinese martial arts comedy films
2018 action comedy films
2018 comedy films
2018 martial arts films
2010s Mandarin-language films
2010s Cantonese-language films
2010s martial arts comedy films
2010s Hong Kong films
Kung fu films
2010s parody films
2010s satirical films
Chinese satirical films